Nehzatabad (also Romanized as Nehẕatābād) is a village in Sadeqiyeh Rural District, in the Central District of Najafabad County, Isfahan Province, Iran. At the 2006 census, its population was 3,016, in 816 families.

References 

Populated places in Najafabad County